John Albert Ryerson (March 1866 – May 16, 1910) was an American tennis player active in the late 19th century. He committed suicide in 1910.

Tennis career
Ryerson reached the quarterfinals of the U.S. National Championships in 1888 and 1890. In 1892, he reached the Challenge Round of the Western States Championships, losing to Samuel T. Chase.

Death
Ryerson later moved to Chicago and was a business manager and was the president of an automobile manufacturer, the Ideal Electric Company. He was married to Violet Stone and had a son, John W. Ryerson.

In November 1909, Ryerson invested $35,000 into the business. The company manufactured electric Brougham cars. He reportedly became distraught when he thought the business was failing, when figures showed assets of only $48,305.

Ryerson committed suicide at approximately 6:10 in the evening on May 16, 1910, jumping out the 13th floor of the Chamber of Commerce building. A man on the 13th floor, E. J. Fucik, was the only known witness to his death, saying, "I saw him raise his hands high in the air and throw himself over the railing." Ryerson had no known business at the building but was one of several recent suicides there. He did not leave a suicide note, but on a note inside his pocket he left the name and address of his brother and had written Psalm 4:8, "I will both lay me down in peace to sleep for thou Lord only maketh me dwell in safety."

The company was not doomed, however. His younger brother, Dr. Edwin Warner Ryerson (1872–1961), took charge of the company as vice president and treasurer, and it was successfully reorganized with additional investments.

Grand Slam finals

Doubles (1 runner-up)

References

1866 births
1910 suicides
Sportspeople from New York City
American male tennis players
Businesspeople from Chicago
Suicides in Illinois
Suicides by jumping in the United States
Date of birth missing
19th-century American businesspeople
1910 deaths
Tennis people from New York (state)